Russell Peters Vs. the World is a 2013 original Netflix documentary series, starring Russell Peters and Matt Schichter. It consists of four episodes following comedian Russell Peters' "Notorious" world tour behind the scenes.

Premise
Russell Peters Vs. the World consists of four episodes following comedian Russell Peters' "Notorious" world tour behind the scenes. The series features Peters' stand up performance in Sydney from early 2013, and includes topics such as ethnic, racial, class and cultural stereotypes.

Cast
 Russell Peters
 Matt Schichter

Release
It was released on October 8, 2013 on Netflix streaming although it has since departed.

References

External links
 
 
 

Netflix original documentary television series
2013 American television series debuts
2013 American television series endings
2010s American documentary television series
English-language Netflix original programming